Ian Ormiston (born 15 June 1963) is a New Zealand cricketer. He played in seven first-class and two List A matches for Wellington in 1987/88.

See also
 List of Wellington representative cricketers

References

External links
 

1963 births
Living people
New Zealand cricketers
Wellington cricketers
Cricketers from New Plymouth